Pitcairnia ferrell-ingramiae is a species of plant in the family Bromeliaceae. It is endemic to Ecuador.  Its natural habitat is subtropical or tropical moist montane forests. It is threatened by habitat loss.

References

ferrell-ingramiae
Endemic flora of Ecuador
Vulnerable plants
Taxonomy articles created by Polbot